The Woman of Colour: A Tale is a novel published anonymously in 1808, about a biracial heiress who travels from Jamaica to England to marry according to the terms of her father's will. The book received moderate praise in three reviews at the time of its publication, but was largely forgotten until a wider interest in women's writing in the period brought it to the attention of scholars; it was brought back into print in 2008. It is now considered an important record in the history of British slavery and abolition, and the history of race, due to its very early depiction of a "racially-conscious mulatto heroine." Substantial research has sought to identify the author of the work, whom some speculate may have been a woman of colour herself, but no consensus has been reached.

Notes

External Links 

 Etext: Anonymous. "The Woman of Colour." Black, Parry, and Kingsbury, Booksellers to the Honourable East India Company, 1808. Literature in Context: An Open Anthology. http://anthologydev.lib.virginia.edu/work/Anonymous/woman-of-colour.

References

 
 
 

1808 novels
Novels about colonialism
Novels about race and ethnicity